The Ganyue Expressway was built in 2004. It connects Jiangxi province and Guangdong province.

Expressways in China
Transport in Jiangxi
Transport in Guangdong